Mark Cavallin (born October 20, 1971) is a Canadian-British former professional ice hockey goaltender.  He played in the British Ice Hockey Superleague for the London Knights, Belfast Giants and the Ayr Scottish Eagles. He also played in the German 2nd Bundesliga for the EC Bad Tölz and EV Regensburg.  He played for the Great Britain national ice hockey team in two World Championships.

External links

1971 births
Living people
Ayr Scottish Eagles players
Belfast Giants players
British ice hockey goaltenders
Canadian ice hockey goaltenders
Chatham Wheels players
EC Bad Tölz players
EV Regensburg players
Ice hockey people from Ontario
Lake Charles Ice Pirates players
London Knights (UK) players
Sportspeople from Mississauga
Tulsa Oilers (1992–present) players
Oakland Skates players
St. Louis Vipers players
Canadian expatriate ice hockey players in England
Canadian expatriate ice hockey players in Scotland
Canadian expatriate ice hockey players in Germany
Canadian expatriate ice hockey players in the United States
Canadian expatriate ice hockey players in Northern Ireland
Naturalised citizens of the United Kingdom
Naturalised sports competitors
British expatriate ice hockey people
British expatriate sportspeople in Italy
British expatriate sportspeople in Germany
Canadian expatriate sportspeople in Italy
Canadian ice hockey coaches
British ice hockey coaches